It's a Jungle in Here is an album by the experimental jazz funk trio Medeski Martin & Wood, released in 1993. The trio supported the album by playing shows with Bio Ritmo. "Bemsha Swing/Lively Up Yourself" is a medley of Thelonious Monk and Bob Marley.

Critical reception

Trouser Press wrote that "the trio transports King Sunny Ade's 'Moti Mo' into a languorous sprawl cleverly accented by Soweto Township-like horns, summons the spirit of the Meters on 'Wiggly's Way' and burns down the joint on the scorching 'Beeah'." The Washington Post noted that "Medeski is both the color and melody man, delighting in thickly layered organ blues lines and emphatic piano chords that add both texture and momentum to 'Shuck It Up' and the title track." The Austin American-Statesman called the album "creative and challenging music, pumped up with strong street sensibilities and performed with undeniable virtuosity."

Track listing
All songs by Medeski Martin & Wood except where noted.

"Beeah" – 6:56
"Where's Sly?" – 5:22
"Shuck It Up" – 7:41
"Sand" – 2:23
"Worms" – 5:04
"Bemsha Swing/Lively Up Yourself" (Thelonious Monk/Bob Marley) – 5:39 
"Moti Mo" (King Sunny Adé) – 7:57
"It's a Jungle in Here" – 3:46
"Syeeda's Song Flute" (John Coltrane) – 5:53
"Wiggly's Way" – 4:09

Performers
John Medeski – organ, piano, wurlitzer
Billy Martin – drums, percussion
Chris Wood – acoustic bass
Steven Bernstein – trumpet, flugelhorn
Josh Roseman – trombone
Jay Rodriguez – tenor & alto saxophones
Dave Binney – alto saxophone
Marc Ribot – guitar

Credits
Horn arrangements by John Medeski
Recorded and mixed by Steven Miller
Mixed at Live Wire Studio, NYC
Photos: Alan Martin
Logo artwork: Billy Martin
Design: Adrienne Di Giovine
Package coordinator: Andrea Pirrotti

References

1993 albums
Medeski Martin & Wood albums
Gramavision Records albums